Trilith Studios is an American film and television production studio located south of Atlanta in Fayette County, Georgia. Originally known as Pinewood Atlanta Studios, the studio has been used to produce many films and television programs, particularly those produced by Marvel Studios. Trilith Studios encompasses a 700-acre site, with a 400-acre backlot and 24 soundstages. A virtual production volume, Prysm Stage, opened in early 2022. As of 2021, Trilith Studios is the largest production facility in the state of Georgia.

History 
The studio was a joint venture between Pinewood and River's Rock LLC, an independently managed trust of the Cathy family, founders of the Chick-fil-A fast-food chain. Pinewood Atlanta would feature at least five sound stages. The Pinewood Group was attracted to Georgia for the studio because of the state's film tax credit.

The first production to film at the studio was Marvel Studios' film Ant-Man (2015), which began in September 2014. In August 2019, Pinewood sold their shares of Pinewood Atlanta to River's Rock LLC, with Frank Patterson expected to remain to run the studio.

In October 2020, the studio was renamed Trilith Studios. Trilith was chosen as the studio's name as "a nod to our U.K. heritage” according to Patterson; its name originated from trilithon, an architectural term referring a structure consisting of two large vertical stones supporting a third stone laid horizontally across the top such as the structures in Stonehenge. In November 2021, it was announced that Trilith, in collaboration with NEP Virtual Studios, would open the virtual production volume Prysm Stage facility in early 2022.

In August 2022, Trilith filed a proposal to add an additional 4.7 million sq. ft. of studio, production, office, warehouse, retail, and residential space south of the existing property by 2032.

Town at Trilith 
In 2016, the Pinewood Forest mixed-use complex was launched. Located across the street from the studio, it features homes along with plans for "a movie theater, restaurants, boutique hotels, retail and office space", built using environmentally friendly building materials. In 2020, when the studio was renamed Trilith Studios, Pinewood Forest was renamed the Town at Trilith. In April 2021, Atlanta magazine ranked the community ninth in their top ten metro Atlanta vibrant city centers list; the community was also the newest featured on the list.

A movie theatre was announced in a press release on December 2018, set to be open in 2020. It was later pushed back to 2021. In 2023, the theatre was redesigned into an entertainment complex called "Trilith Live". The complex will include an 1,800 seat auditorium, two live television stages, and various food and retail shops. The complex is set to be open in 2025.

Racial discrimination lawsuit 
In July 2022, Brianna Sacks of Buzzfeed News alleged that African American individuals faced unequal treatment to the majority white population. In September 2022, several residents held a public protest outside the studios. In November 2022, five current and former African American residents sued the site's housing development for racial discrimination. One resident cited complaints back in 2018, while another cited an assault with racial slurs that occurred in March 2022. Trilith issued a statement, alleging that five residents who filed the lawsuit "never had any employment or other relationship with Trilith Studios." They further condemned the March 2022 incident and wrote that their goal is to "provide creators of all demographics, backgrounds, upbringings, and abilities an environment that fosters inclusion and belonging and the opportunities and resources to share their stories".

Education 
In 2016, a soundstage at Pinewood Studios was open for educational use by the Georgia Film Academy. The site was formerly occupied by Rivers Elementary School. In late 2020, the Georgia Film Academy partnered with Trilith and the University of Georgia to launch its Master of Fine Arts film program; students would work and live in Trilith during their second year. Trilith also has a small K-12 school called "The Forest School".

Stages, studios, and locations 
, Trilith Studios encompasses a 700-acre site, with a 400-acre backlot. It features 1 million square feet of production facilities, with 24 soundstages, 40 on-site production vendors, and 75,000 square feet of stages equipped for virtual production technologies.

Prysm Stage 
The Prysm Stage is a virtual production volume in a purpose-built  stage, featuring 360 degrees of LED panels and ceiling. It is able to accommodate large set pieces, in-camera visual effects, and is equipped for game-engine-driven video playback. Additionally, it has a dedicated process stage designed for automotive shoots.

Productions

As Pinewood Atlanta Studios

Films 
Ant-Man (2015)
Captain America: Civil War (2016)
Passengers (2016)
Guardians of the Galaxy Vol. 2 (2017)
Spider-Man: Homecoming (2017)
Krystal (2017)
Black Panther (2018)
Avengers: Infinity War (2018)
Ant-Man and the Wasp (2018)
Avengers: Endgame (2019)
Zombieland: Double Tap (2019)
The Tomorrow War (2021)
The Suicide Squad (2021)

Television series 
 Moon and Me (2019)
 Love Is Blind (2020)
WandaVision (2021)
The Falcon and the Winter Soldier (2021)
Loki (2021)

As Trilith Studios

Films 
 Spider-Man: No Way Home (2021)
 Black Adam (2022)
 Black Panther: Wakanda Forever (2022)
 Guardians of the Galaxy Vol. 3 (2023)
 Captain America: New World Order (2024)
 Megalopolis (TBA)

Television series 
Family Feud (2021)
 Hawkeye (2021)
 Steve on Watch (2021)
College Bowl (2022)
 Ms. Marvel (2022)
 She-Hulk: Attorney at Law (2022)
Judge Steve Harvey (2022)
Werewolf by Night (2022)
 The Guardians of the Galaxy Holiday Special (2022)
Ironheart (2023)
Agatha: Coven of Chaos (2023)

References

External links 
 

2013 establishments in Georgia (U.S. state)
American film studios
Buildings and structures in Fayette County, Georgia
Planned communities in the United States
Television studios in the United States